Abida Sidik Mia is a Malawian politician. She is the Member of Parliament for Chikwawa Nkombezi.

Political career 
She was elected to the Parliament of Malawi in the 2019 general election.

Mia was appointed Deputy Minister for Lands in 2020. In 2022, she was made Water and Sanitation Minister.

Personal life 
She is the widow of former minister Sidik Mia.

References 

Living people
Democratic Progressive Party (Malawi) politicians

Government ministers of Malawi
Women government ministers of Malawi
Members of the National Assembly (Malawi)
21st-century Malawian women politicians
21st-century Malawian politicians
Year of birth missing (living people)
Place of birth missing (living people)